Trichromia phaeocrota is a moth in the family Erebidae. It is found in French Guiana and Venezuela.

Taxonomy
This species was first described by Paul Dognin in 1911 and originally named Paranerita phaeocrota. George Francis Hampson described this species in 1920 in his Catalogue of the Lepidoptera Phalænæ in the British museum. The male type specimen, collected in French Guiana at Saint Jean du Maroni, is held at the Natural History Museum, London.

Description 
Hampson described this species as follows:

References

Moths described in 1911
phaeocrota
Taxa named by Paul Dognin